is a fictional character featured in the manga series Bungo Stray Dogs. He is a member of the Armed Detective Agency and former executive of the underworld organization, the Port Mafia.

Osamu Dazai was created by writer Kafka Asagiri and illustrator Sango Harukawa. His look and personality were designed to contrast with the young lead, Atsushi's, while his name is the same as that of the late author Osamu Dazai. His backstory was also influenced by the real life Dazai as the author was captivated by a picture of him and two other writers. In the animated version of the series the character is voiced by Mamoru Miyano in Japanese and Kaiji Tang in English.

The fictional Osamu Dazai has been popular in Japan often appearing in polls and winning awards from different magazines. Critical reception to his portrayal in the anime and manga has been mostly positive due to his interactions with his partners, Doppo Kunikida and Chuuya Nakahara, his personality, and his character traits. Nevertheless, the character's frequent attempts to commit suicide were criticized for being too dark to be humorous but changed his mind for Mk.

Creation and design

Named after Japanese author Osamu Dazai (1909–1948), 
Asagiri created the fictional character to contrast with the protagonist Atsushi Nakajima. His main traits are his slender figure, humorous personality, and his persistent attempts to commit suicide. Harukawa covered Dazai's body in bandages alongside other items when conceptualizing his design, meant to represent his obsession with suicide. Asagiri was surprised by Harukawa's designs for the protagonists. Another contrast between the main characters was the idea of balancing their colors so Dazai's black hair contrasted with Atsushi's white hair.

In writing Dazai's backstory for the light novels, Asagiri was inspired by a picture that had the real artists Dazai, Ango Sakaguchi and Sakunosuke Oda. The seemingly natural state the trio had inspired Asagiri to write Osamu Dazai and the Dark Era. Another aspect of the trio that inspired the fiction was how the real Dazai reacted to Oda's death. The real Dazai was also a fan of Ryūnosuke Akutagawa's works, but in fiction this was reversed in terms of the relationship between the two characters with the same name. Asagiri decided to keep this reason up to the reader.

When first reading the manga, anime director Yasuomi Umetsu was impressed by the relationship Dazai had with his students Atsushi, and Ryunosuke Akutagawa. This gave the staff ideas for making the symbolic sequences in the opening and closing video scenes of the anime series where the three characters are featured. The staff noted Dazai had a mentor-like relationship with Atsushi and Akutagawa which led to scenes where he is seen trying to pat their heads. For the film Bungo Stray Dogs: Dead Apple Asagiri suggested that Studio Bones change Dazai's hairstyle. Despite this redesign, and Dazai having associated with the main villain, Asagiri said they are not the main focus of the film; that is on Atsushi, Kyoka Izumi and Akutagawa. Furthermore, Asagiri conceived the idea of the story starting with Dazai's death and how he would be revived across the story. He wondered, however, what the cause of death should have been. Another idea for Dazai's characterization in the film was not to change it but focus on how he treats other people.

Voice actor Mamoru Miyano found the younger Dazai more challenging to voice. Because of his darker personality, with little care for others, Miyano had to use a duller tone of voice. This stage of Dazai's character made a deep impression on him. Miyano also noted that Dazai managed to become a better person thanks to his friendship with Odasaku and Ango. In retrospect, Miyano felt that Dazai's darker period gave him a further understanding of his character as he changed across the story. Since being hired to be the English voice actor for Osamu Dazai, Kaiji Tang looked forward to working on Bungo Stray Dogs, having previously watched the series. Tang was delighted to voice Dazai for the English dub, attracted by his comical attitude.

Appearances

In Bungo Stray Dogs

Manga
A member of the Armed Detective Agency who takes Atsushi under his wing, Dazai is known for being a "suicide maniac" because of his wish to commit suicide and die comfortably one day, preferably with a beautiful woman. Under his carefree and relaxed demeanor, however, Dazai is extremely cunning, intelligent, skilled and brutal, once being a feared executive for the Port Mafia. His ability, lets him completely nullify any supernatural ability by touch. Dazai takes a liking to Atsushi as his underling starts working for the Agency, believing him to be superior to some of the mafia's men. When allowing himself to be kidnapped by the Port Mafia, Dazai tells his former underling Ryūnosuke Akutagawa that Atsushi is superior to him, angering Akutagawa. However, the relationship turns into an alliance between the Agency and the mafia to face a group known as the Guild. During the fight, Dazai joins forces with his former mafia ally, Chuuya Nakahara, to face members of the Guild.

After the Guild's defeat, Dazai meets Fyodor Dostoyevsky, the leader of the Rats in the House of the Dead who has one of his allies wound the leaders of the Agency and Port Mafia to generate chaos between each group to see who will get the cure. Afterwards, Dazai is shot by one of Dostoyevsky's underlings, and ends up in the hospital. On recovering, Dazai has the Agency's members track Dostoyevsky's underling who has the key to the cure while he and members from the Guild manage to locate Dostoyevsky and have him arrested. However, Dostoyevsky's men threaten the Agency again and Dazai is imprisoned. Despite his imprisonment, Dazai requests help from Ango to give orders to the Agency to fight against Dostoyevsky's Decay of the Angel members and the government.

In light novels
The light novels follow Dazai's backstory. Osamu Dazai's Entrance Exam plot describes how Dazai joined the Detective Agency and met his future partners. At the age of 20, he joined the Armed Detective Company on the recommendation of Chief Taneda of the Ministry of Internal Affair's Special Ability Department, and—as a newbie—was entrusted by Fukuzawa Yukichi to Doppo Kunikida. Shortly afterwards, they were both assigned to work on the Serial Disappearance of Yokohama's Visitors Case, which Kunikida decided would be Dazai's entrance exam. Osamu Dazai and the Dark Era involves his relationship with hitman Oda Sakunosuke four years before the events of the manga when he was working for the mafia, culminating with Oda encouraging Dazai to leave the group and find a new way of living which does not involve committing murder. Dazai, Chuuya, Fifteen Years Old follows Dazai's life as a member of the Port Mafia. Dazai, under the watchful eye of Ōgai Mori, receives his first mission to investigate a ghost. He and Chuuya Nakahara used to be partners during his days in the Mafia, and together—after they had decimated an enemy organization in one night—they became notorious and dubbed the "Criminal Underworld's Worst Enemy", earning the title .

The character is also present in the light novel BEAST: White Akutagawa, Black Atsushi, in an alternate version of his world, still working for Port Mafia alongside Atsushi and Kyoka Izumi. He also appears in the light novel Bungo Stray Dogs: 55 Minutes where the Agency is given the job of finding a thief.

In other media
Dazai appears in the 2018 film Bungo Stray Dogs: Dead Apple as a member of the Detective Agency. At the request of Ango Sakaguchi, the Armed Detective Agency investigates Tatsuhiko Shibusawa, a self-described "collector", tied to an incident involving multiple suicides. Dazai allies himself with Shibusawa to counter his plans, and is stabbed and left to die. Chuya manages to save Dazai, thanks to the latter's planning and prediction of Shibusawa's betrayal. The manga adaptation of the film also includes Dazai. Dazai is present in the gag series Wan! where he is depicted in a super deformed form.

In the mobile phone game Bungo Stray Dogs: Tales of the Lost, Dazai appears as a playable character. He is also a guest character in Yume 100. In the series' play, Dazai was played by Hideya Tawada.

Reception

Critical

After his introduction the site Manga.Tokyo welcomed Dazai commenting on his appealing interactions with Doppo Kunikida. The Fandom Post agreed with Manga.Tokyo with respect to his interactions with Kunikida, while also acknowledging his character comes across as intelligent despite his childish personality. His interactions with Atsushi also received positive responses. Though not satisfied with his introduction, The Fandom Post regarded Dazai as a "fun character" as well as "probably the strongest part of the series thus far. Both Anime News Network and Anime UK News were more critical because of the black comedy of his frequent suicide attempts, something that referenced the real life Dazai. The reviewer also hinted his bandages might imply there are more failed attempts at suicide in his past. Nevertheless, his personality and interactions with others were noted to have made the story amusing despite its dark tone. Dazai's attempt to kill himself again, but with a woman working for Port Mafia, was also thought to be a reference to the real Dazaiwhich might come across as offensive. Reel Run Down enjoyed Dazai to the point of finding him one of the most enjoyable characters in the entire series because of his cheerful personality, which is given further depth when the second season explores his dark past.

Writers commented on Dazai's past persona from the light novels and its animated adaptation. Manga.Tokyo highly praised the relationship between Dazai and Odasaku since it shows the impact Odasaku had on the Dazai's characterization and growth as a person which contrasted with his regular personality, while UK Anime Network felt it made the cast look more rounded in the general due to the multiple use literal characters based on real life. Dazai's debut in the anime's third season earned praise from Manga.Tokyo for once again exploring his teenage years where his relationship with Chuuya Nakahara is revealed in the form of flashback episodes. The site noted that the debut explores the relationship between Dazai and Mori and how Mori sees himself in Dazai. Anime News Network noted how dark this incarnation of Dazai is as he does not appear to care for other people and instead ponders the idea of killing himself in contrast to his cheerful persona from the regular series. Nevertheless, the site liked his dynamic with Chuuya with the Fandom Post echoing similar comments especially during the Guild arc as the duo can still fighter together despite their distanced relationships.

Besides his regular appearances, Fandom post enjoyed the panicking Dazai from the series' spin-off Bungo Stray Dogs Wan due to how nervous he acts when realizing that one of the he went too harsh with his prank on Kunikida. Similarly, Anime News Network enjoyed Dazai's alternate actions in Wan, such as him being a kindergarten teacher, as enjoyable takes on the series. In a review of Bungo Stray Dogs: Dead Apple, the site pointed out that Dazai was one of only two characters who understood Shibusawa Tatsuhiko. Anime News Network felt that his role in the film teaming up with Shibusawa Tatsuhiko and Fyodor to be too difficult to complete based on mthe multiple stakes.

Dazai's actors were also well received by the media. Manga.Tokyo enjoyed Mamoru Miyano's performance as Dazai's voice actor ever since his introduction. The Fandom Post said with Mamoru Miyano's "acting range helping his versatile characterization immensely." Dazai was also voted as the second best Miyano character in a poll from AnimeAnime. In another review the site again enjoyed Miyano's performance as he changed his vocal tone to characterize Dazai's personality in the past. UK Anime News further complimented Miyano saying fits the "eccentric personality of Dazai extremely well" Reel Run Down found Kaiji Tang's work as Dazai enjoyable due to the joy he brings to the role.

Popularity
The character has been highly popular in Japan. In 2017, Dazai was voted as the fifth best male character in Newtype magazine for his role in the anime series. In the 2017–2018 Newtype Anime Awards, Dazai took third place for his role in the film. In another poll, he took second place. He also had a cameo in the anime film Eureka Seven: Hi-Evolution. In a 2017 Otaku Hit Ranking poll, Dazai took tenth place in the category: Which one of these 2D characters do you think has been the most popular this year? In a Newtype poll, Dazai was voted the fourteenth-most-popular male anime character from the 2010s. Rebecca Silverman referred to Dazai as her favorite character from 2016 despite first appearing in multiple suicide jokes, she felt he shows depths that portray him as a more mature person who influences Atsushi and Akutagawa to become stronger people. In a Charapedia poll from 2016, Dazai was voted the most sexually appealing character in anime by female voters while he took the second place behind Rem from Re:Zero in the aggregate poll. In an Anime!Anime! poll, Dazai and Chuya were voted as one of the best anime rivals turned into allies.

References

Comics characters introduced in 2012
Fictional attempted suicides
Fictional characters based on real people
Fictional characters with anti-magic or power negation abilities
Fictional gangsters
Fictional Japanese people in anime and manga
Fictional mass murderers
Fictional pranksters
Fictional private investigators
Fictional tricksters
Male characters in anime and manga